Ksenija Predikaka (born 11 March 1970, in Ljubljana) is a retired Slovenian athlete who specialised in the long jump. She represented her country at the 1996 Summer Olympics as well as two indoor and one outdoor World Championships.

Her personal bests in the event are 6.64 metres outdoors (+1.4 m/s, Ljubljana 1996) and 6.49 metres indoors (Ljubljana 1995).

Competition record

References

1970 births
Living people
Sportspeople from Ljubljana
Slovenian female long jumpers
Olympic athletes of Slovenia
Athletes (track and field) at the 1996 Summer Olympics
World Athletics Championships athletes for Slovenia
Mediterranean Games silver medalists for Slovenia
Mediterranean Games medalists in athletics
Athletes (track and field) at the 1993 Mediterranean Games
Athletes (track and field) at the 1997 Mediterranean Games